Edward Lindsay may refer to:

Edward Lindsay (politician), Texas politician in Texas Legislature elections, 2006
Edward Lindsay-Hogg of the Lindsay-Hogg Baronets

See also
Ed Lindsey, Georgia politician
Ted Lindsay (disambiguation)